Tridrepana crocea is a moth in the family Drepanidae. It was described by John Henry Leech in 1889. It is found in China (Zhejiang, Hubei, Jiangxi, Hunan, Fujian, Guangxi, Sichuan, Yunnan), Japan and Korea.

References

Moths described in 1889
Drepaninae